Oleksiy Ihorovych Lobov (born 16 August 1997) is a Ukrainian professional footballer who plays as a centre-back for Dordoi Bishkek.

Career
On 16 January 2023, Dordoi Bishkek announced the signing of Lobov to a one-year contract.

References

External links
 
 

1997 births
Living people
People from Luhansk Oblast
Ukrainian footballers
Association football defenders
FC Kramatorsk players
FC Kolos Kovalivka players
FC Obolon-Brovar Kyiv players
FC Hebar Pazardzhik players
Ukrainian First League players
First Professional Football League (Bulgaria) players
Ukrainian expatriate footballers
Expatriate footballers in Bulgaria
Ukrainian expatriate sportspeople in Bulgaria